Makassar Strait is a strait between the islands of Borneo and Sulawesi in Indonesia. To the north it joins the Celebes Sea, while to the south it meets the Java Sea. To the northeast, it forms the Sangkulirang Bay south of the Mangkalihat Peninsula. The strait is an important regional shipping route in Southeast Asia.

The Mahakam River and Karangan River of Borneo empty into the strait.

Ports along the strait include Balikpapan and Bontang in Borneo, and Makassar, Palu, and Parepare in Sulawesi. The city of Samarinda is 48 km (30 mi) from the strait, along the Mahakam.

Extent
The International Hydrographic Organization (IHO) defines the Makassar Strait as being one of the waters of the East Indian Archipelago. The IHO defines its limits as follows:
The channel between the East coast of Borneo and the West coast of Celebes [Sulawesi], is bounded:

On the North. By a line joining Tanjong Mangkalihat, Borneo and Stroomen Kaap (Cape Binar), Celebes.

On the South. By a line from the Southwestern extreme of Celebes, through the Southern point of Tana Keke, to the Southern extreme of Laoet thence up the West coast of that island to Tanjong Kiwi and thence across to Tanjong Petang, Borneo at the Southern end of Laoet Strait.

Gallery

See also 
Battle of Makassar Strait
USS Makassar Strait
 Strait of Malacca
 Sunda Strait
 Lombok Strait
 Wallace Line
Sadang River

References

Landforms of Sulawesi
Straits of Indonesia
Bodies of water of the Celebes Sea
Landforms of South Sulawesi
Landforms of Central Sulawesi
Landforms of East Kalimantan
Landforms of Kalimantan